Virbia fragilis is a moth in the  family Erebidae. It was described by Strecker in 1878. It is found in open fields in the Black Hills in South Dakota and in Boulder, Colorado. The range extends north to Alberta and British Columbia and south to New Mexico.

References

Natural History Museum Lepidoptera generic names catalog

Moths described in 1878
fragilis
Taxa named by Herman Strecker